Agemono may refer to:

Agemono, a category of deep-fried dishes in Japanese cuisine
Agemono nabe, a pot used to cook agemono dishes